Pseudomonas virus 42, formerly Pseudomonas phage 42, is a bacteriophage known to infect Pseudomonas bacteria.

References

Myoviridae